The first South Australian Railways I class locomotive was built by Neilson and Company, Scotland for the Canterbury Provincial Railways, New Zealand in 1873 and numbered 9. In May 1878 the South Australian Railways (SAR) purchased it. The ship that transported it to South Australia was wrecked, but the locomotive was salvaged and entered service on the SAR in April 1879 as number 38. In 1880 or 1881 it was renumbered 48. It was allocated to "I" class – which was ultimately to be known as the "first I class" – in 1887 or 1888. In October 1905 the SAR withdrew it from service, then sold it in May 1906 to the South Australian Harbours Board for use in the construction of the Outer Harbour breakwater. It was scrapped in August 1909.

History
This locomotive was originally built as Canterbury Provincial Railways No. 9 for work on the  broad gauge Christchurch to Lyttleton line. When the New Zealand Government made the decision to convert the  broad gauge line to  narrow gauge in May 1878, No. 9 and all other rolling stock were sold to the South Australian Railways. On the voyage to South Australia, the ship carrying the rolling stock was wrecked off the coast of New Zealand. No. 9 and the other locomotives were eventually salvaged made their way to Port Adelaide. 

No. 9 finally entered the SAR as No 38 (later No. 48) on 15 April 1879, and became a member of the I Class in 1887/88. No. 48 shunted the station yard and wharf at Morgan for many years until it was sold to the South Australian Harbours Board in May 1906. The company used this locomotive to assist with the construction work of the Outer Harbour breakwater, until it was condemned in August 1909 and eventually scrapped.

References

Neilson locomotives
Broad gauge locomotives in Australia
I1
0-4-0T locomotives